Buton Regency (Kabupaten Buton) is a regency of Indonesia's Southeast Sulawesi Province, lying entirely on Buton Island. Until 2014 it had an area of 2,681.22 km2, and a population estimated at 276,944 (for January 2014). However, in 2014 it was divided into three regencies, with two new regencies being cut out of it; the residual area now is 1,648.04 km2, and the districts in that area contained a population of 94,388 at the 2010 Census while the 2020 Census produced a total of 115,207; the official estimate as at mid 2021 was 117,040.

The capital is nominally at Pasarwajo, but the administrative centre is in the city of Baubau on the south-west of the island, although that city is administratively separate from the Regency.

Administration 
The Buton Regency was divided at 2010 into 21 districts (kecamatan), but in 2012 it was announced that the regency was to be split, with the southern seven districts split off to form a new Buton Selatan Regency, and seven other districts split off to form a new Buton Tengah Regency (although the latter does not contain any part of Buton Island). This division was made effective in 2014.

The remaining seven districts are tabulated below with their areas, their populations at the 2010 Census and the 2020 Census, together with the official estimates as at mid 2021. The table also includes the locations of the district administrative centres, the number of villages (rural desa and urban kelurahan) in each district, and its post code.

Notes: (a) includes 6 small offshore islands. (b) includes 5 small offshore islands.

Climate
Buton regency has a tropical monsoon climate (Am) with moderate rainfall from July to October and heavy rainfall from November to June. The following climate data is for the town of Pasarwajo, the seat of the regency.

References

Regencies of Southeast Sulawesi